Alaus oculatus, commonly called the eastern eyed click beetle or eyed elater, is a species of click beetle.

Description
They have an elongated body, black in color throughout. The pronotum exhibits a large oval patch of darker scales, framed in white, on each side - the common name of the beetle derives from this feature. The elytra are striated and mottled with silvery whitish scales. The "false eyes" depicted on the pronotum are a defensive adaption that has evolved because of its advantage confusing or frightening potential predators. The eyespots are a form of self-mimicry, in which one part of the body has adapted to mimic another body part. Like all click beetles, A. oculatus is also capable of suddenly catapulting itself out of danger by releasing the energy stored by a click mechanism, which consists of a stout spine on the prosternum and a matching groove in the mesosternum.

Life cycle
Eggs are laid in soil or on standing deadwood. Many larvae from the click beetle family Elateridae are commonly referred to as wireworms and are prominent agricultural pests that feast on plant matter. However, the larvae of Alaus oculatus are unique among wireworms because they are predatory to other beetle larvae feeding in decaying wood, especially Cerambycidae. The larva pupate in rotting logs or below the ground and the adults emerge in the spring and are commonly found until September.

Diet
The adults do not eat much but their diet consists of nectar and plant juice. The larvae diet consists of grubs of wood-boring beetles. The larvae are voracious on wood borers, and that during their development caged specimens were observed to devour more than 200 cerambycid larvae each.

Distribution and habitat
This species is present in Central and North America. It can be found in deciduous/mixed forests and woodlands.

References

External links

Elateridae
Beetles of North America
Beetles described in 1758
Taxa named by Carl Linnaeus